Hamo de Crevequer (died 1263) was an Anglo-Norman nobleman who held the office of Lord Warden of the Cinque Ports.

Gerinun de Holeburn was in 1263 one of a jury of twelve assembled lawfully to conclude upon an ‘inquisition into how much land ‘Hamo de Creuker’, (Crevequer) Baron of Chatham, deceased, held of our Lord the King, at Ledes’ in Kent.

Hamo de Crevequer took possession of his lands at Brenchley in 1217; he was succeeded by his grandson Robert. In 1264/5, Robert's lands were seized by Gilbert de Clare, 3rd Earl of Gloucester. It is recorded that from 29 April 1230 a market was held each Sunday by Hamo de Crevequer, until it was ordained by Henry III on 30 June 1233, that the market formally held in the churchyard should in future be held on de Crevequer's own land, but on a Saturday.

Hamo de Crevequer acquired property in Folkestone, Kent, England, from the barony of the family of Abrincis.  Hamo quitclaimed the advowson of the church of Alkham and chapel of Manrege to St Radegunds (Radigunds) Abbey, in Kent in 1258, in which charter he refers to his wife, Maud de Abrincis [d'Avranches].

His daughter, Isolde, who was born after 1251, was married to John de Sandwich. She subsequently married Nicholas Merryweather was born between 1251–1286 in Lenham, Kent, England, some time during the reign of King Edward I of England (1272–1307). On 12 June 1285 Edward I inspected a charter of Robert de Crevequer, granting the Castle of Ledes the fair of Chatham. By 1380 the fair had become the king's own right, for his wife.

By 1296 the market at Brenchley was being held by Gilbert de Clare, earl of Gloucester and Hertford, and in 1312 de Clare claimed that his ancestors had held the market 'from time out of mind'. De Clare followed Hamo de Crevequer, some years later as Lord Warden of the Cinque Ports.

References

1263 deaths
13th-century English Navy personnel
Lords Warden of the Cinque Ports
Year of birth unknown
People from Brenchley